Lophoturus madecassus is a species of bristly millipede in the family Lophoproctidae. Adults in this species, unlike those in all other species in this family, have only 11 pairs of legs rather than the typical 13 pairs of legs.

References

Further reading

 

Polyxenida
Articles created by Qbugbot
Animals described in 1950